SMS Nürnberg was a  light cruiser built during World War I by Germany for the Imperial Navy. The ship was named after the previous light cruiser , which had been sunk at the Battle of the Falkland Islands. The new cruiser was laid down in 1915 at the AG Weser shipyard in Bremen, launched in April 1916, and commissioned into the High Seas Fleet in February 1917.

Nürnberg saw relatively limited service during the war, due to her commissioning late in the conflict. She participated in Operation Albion in October 1917 against the Russian Navy in the Baltic. The following month, she was engaged in the Second Battle of Helgoland Bight, but was not significantly damaged during the engagement. She was assigned to the final, planned operation of the High Seas Fleet that was to have taken place in the closing days of the war, though a major mutiny forced the cancellation of the plan. After the end of the war, the ship was interned in Scapa Flow. In the scuttling of the German fleet in June 1919, British ships managed to beach Nürnberg and she was later refloated and sunk as a gunnery target in 1922.

Design

Her propulsion system consisted of two sets of steam turbines powered by ten coal-fired and two oil-fired Marine-type boilers. The ship had a crew of 17 officers and 458 enlisted men.

The ship was armed with a main battery of eight  SK L/45 guns in single pedestal mounts. Two were placed side by side forward on the forecastle, two were located on either side amidships, and two were arranged in a superfiring pair aft. They were supplied with 1,040 rounds of ammunition, for 130 shells per gun. Nürnberg also carried two  SK L/45 anti-aircraft guns mounted on the centerline astern of the funnels. She was also equipped with a pair of  torpedo tubes with eight torpedoes in deck-mounted swivel launchers amidships. She also carried 200 mines.

Service history
Nürnberg was ordered under the contract name "Ersatz " and was laid down at the AG Weser shipyard in Bremen in 1915. She was launched on 14 April 1916, after which fitting-out work commenced. She thereafter began sea trials, which concluded on 1 May, at which time she was assigned to II Scouting Group, part of the reconnaissance screen of the High Seas Fleet. From July to August, the ships of II Scouting Group were used in coastal defense patrols in the German Bight.

Operation Albion

In early September 1917, following the German conquest of the Russian port of Riga, the German navy decided to eliminate the Russian naval forces that still held the Gulf of Riga. The Admiralstab (the Navy High Command) planned an operation to seize the Baltic island of Ösel, and specifically the Russian gun batteries on the Sworbe Peninsula. On 18 September, the order was issued for a joint operation with the army to capture Ösel and Moon Islands; the primary naval component was to comprise the flagship, along with III and IV Battle Squadrons of the High Seas Fleet. The invasion force amounted to approximately 24,600 officers and enlisted men. Nürnberg and the rest of II Scouting Group, commanded by Rear Admiral Ludwig von Reuter, provided the cruiser screen for the task force. II Scouting Group left Kiel on 23 September and arrived in Libau two days later, where final preparations for the attack took place.

On 11 October, Nürnberg took on a contingent of soldiers and got underway as part of the escort for several transport ships, carrying most of the landing force, and a collier and several tugboats. The force arrived in Tagga Bay the next morning and began the attack, when Moltke and the III Squadron ships engaged Russian positions in Tagga Bay while IV Squadron shelled Russian gun batteries on the Sworbe Peninsula on Ösel After the beginning of the bombardment, Nürnberg entered Tagga Bay with II Transport Section and began landing troops, while Königsberg covered the landing of I Transport Section. On 18–19 October, the rest of II Scouting Group covered minesweepers operating off the island of Dagö, but due to insufficient minesweepers and bad weather, the operation was postponed. Reuter could not locate the vessels, and broke off the operation. 

By 20 October, the islands were under German control and the Russian naval forces had either been destroyed or forced to withdraw. The Admiralstab ordered the naval component to return to the North Sea. Nürnberg remained at in the gulf until 24 October, when she got underway for the North Sea, stopping in Libau on the way back. After arriving in the North Sea, Nürnberg and the rest of II Scouting Group resumed coastal defense duties.

Second Battle of Helgoland Bight

Six British battlecruisers supported a force of light cruisers that attacked the German minesweepers. Königsberg and the other three cruisers covered the fleeing minesweepers before retreating under a smoke screen. Heavy smoke and fog obscured the British ships, however, and Nürnberg was quickly forced to cease firing.

Nürnberg was not hit directly, but shell splinters from near misses rained down on her deck, causing light casualties. According to the historian Gary Staff, the hit killed one man and wounded four more, one of whom later died of his wounds, while the historians Hans Hildebrand, Albert Röhr, and Hans-Otto Steinmetz report one fatality and nine wounded men. One of her rangefinders was also damaged by the shell fragments. She returned fire briefly before the haze again concealed the British ships. Kaiser and Kaiserin intervened at almost exactly the same time, prompting the British to break off the engagement immediately. Within an hour, the German forces were reinforced by several capital ships, including the battlecruiser ; after realizing the British had fled, the German forces returned to port.

Fate

FK Hans Quaet-Faslem relieved Hildebrand as the ship's commander in January 1918. On 23 March, Nürnberg was dry-docked in Kiel for an overhaul that lasted until 6 May, so she was unavailable for the fleet operation on 23–24 April, the last time the German fleet went to sea for a major operation. After returning to service, Nürnberg covered a minelaying operation from 10 to 13 May in company with the rest of her group. She was also among the vessels that sortied in an attempt to catch the British aircraft carrier  after the Tondern raid on 19 July. That month, FK Wolfgang Wegener replaced Quaet-Faslem.

In October, Admirals Reinhard Scheer and Franz von Hipper planned a final, climactic attack on the British by the High Seas Fleet. The planned operation called for raids on Allied shipping in the Thames estuary and Flanders to draw out the Grand Fleet. The German fleet would then attack the Grand Fleet and do as much damage as possible in order to enhance Germany's military position in the coming peace talks. On the morning of 29 October 1918, the order was given to sail from Wilhelmshaven the following day. The unrest spread to the rest of the fleet and ultimately forced Hipper and Scheer to cancel the operation.

Following the capitulation of Germany in November 1918, most of the High Seas Fleet's ships, under the command of Reuter, were interned in the British naval base in Scapa Flow. Nürnberg was among the ships interned, and she departed Germany with the rest of the fleet on 19 November. The vessels arrived in Scapa Flow on 27 November. The fleet remained in captivity during the negotiations that ultimately produced the Versailles Treaty. Reuter believed that the British intended to seize the German ships on 21 June 1919, which was the deadline for Germany to have signed the peace treaty. Unaware that the deadline had been extended to the 23rd, Reuter ordered the ships to be sunk at the next opportunity. On the morning of 21 June, the British fleet left Scapa Flow to conduct training maneuvers, and at 11:20 Reuter transmitted the order to his ships. British sailors used explosive charges to blast away Nürnbergs anchor chains so she could be dragged aground before she sank. 

The ship was refloated in July and towed to Portsmouth, where she was converted into a target ship. Coal was shifted to one side to make Nürnberg take on a list of 10 degrees to simulate the angle a shell would hit the cruiser at long range. Terror had been fitted with a  gun and a  gun for the purposes of the tests, which involved several different shell types for both calibers. Terror made hits on specific parts of the ship, including the conning tower, the belt armor, the upper deck, and the unarmored superstructure. Flooding from the belt hits caused the list to be reduced to 7.5 degrees. Another round of tests was held on 8 November, and this time Nürnbergs coal bunkers were flooded to bring her list to 20 degrees.

Notes

References

Further reading
 
 

Königsberg-class cruisers (1915)
Ships built in Kiel
1916 ships
World War I cruisers of Germany
Ships sunk as targets
World War I warships scuttled at Scapa Flow
Maritime incidents in 1919
Maritime incidents in 1922
Shipwrecks in the English Channel